Anne Archer (born August 24, 1947) is an American actress. Archer was named Miss Golden Globe in 1971, and in the year following, appeared in her feature film debut The Honkers (1972). She had supporting roles in Cancel My Reservation (1972), The All-American Boy (1973), and Trackdown (1976), and appeared in Good Guys Wear Black (1978), Paradise Alley (1978) and Hero at Large (1980).  

Archer earned widespread acclaim for starring as Beth in the erotic psychological thriller film Fatal Attraction (1987), which earned her nominations for the Academy Award, BAFTA Award and Golden Globe Award for Best Supporting Actress. Furthering this success was her role in Robert Altman's Short Cuts (1993), which won her a Golden Globe Award and a Volpi Cup, and appearances in Paradise Alley (1978), Raise the Titanic (1980), Patriot Games (1992) and Clear and Present Danger (1994). 

Since the 2000s, Archer has sporadically worked in acting. She appeared in the film Lullaby (2014) and made her stage debut as Mrs Robinson in the West End production of The Graduate in 2001. She played the namesake actress in The Trial of Jane Fonda at the 2014 Edinburgh Festival Fringe, and had recurring roles on television shows such as Boston Public (2003), It's Always Sunny in Philadelphia (2006) and Ghost Whisperer (2006–2008).

Early life
Archer was born in Los Angeles, California, the daughter of actors John Archer and Marjorie Lord. She graduated from Pitzer College in Claremont, California, in 1968.

Archer married William Davis in 1969. They had one son, Thomas William "Tommy" Davis, born on August 18, 1972. The couple divorced in 1977. She married Terry Jastrow in 1979. They have one son together, Jeffrey Tucker Jastrow, born on October 18, 1984. She was originally a Christian Scientist, but she and her husband have been members of the Church of Scientology since 1975. Archer's stepfather was the Los Angeles banker and philanthropist, Harry Volk. 

Between 1982 and 1986, she was a spokeswoman for Applied Scholastics, the literacy training organization sponsored by the Church of Scientology. Her son Tommy was the head of the Church of Scientology's Celebrity Centre International in Los Angeles. In 1991, Archer spoke publicly about her abortion in the book The Choices We Made: Twenty-Five Women and Men Speak Out About Abortion.

Career
Archer began her career after graduating from college. She appeared as Ramona in the "Ramona Pageant" in Hemet, California before moving to New York. In the 1970s she appeared in television series, including Hawaii Five-O, The Mod Squad, Ironside, and Little House on the Prairie. She also was a regular cast member on the short-lived ABC sitcom Bob & Carol & Ted & Alice in 1973. She was named Miss Golden Globe in 1971. 

Her first feature film was 1972 comedy The Honkers co-starring opposite James Coburn and Lois Nettleton. She later had supporting roles in Cancel My Reservation (1972), The All-American Boy (1973), and Trackdown (1976). In 1976, she had a female leading role in the drama film Lifeguard starring alongside Sam Elliott. She auditioned for the role of Lois Lane in the 1978 superhero film Superman, a role eventually awarded to Margot Kidder. Archer continued to appear in feature films, including Good Guys Wear Black (1978) starring Chuck Norris, Paradise Alley (1978) opposite Sylvester Stallone, and Hero at Large (1980), co-starring John Ritter.

In early 1980s, Archer appeared in several smaller movies and made-for-television movies. In 1983, she moved to television with a leading role in the short-lived NBC drama series The Family Tree, playing a divorced woman with three children. In 1985, she joined the cast of CBS prime time soap opera Falcon Crest, playing manipulative businesswoman Cassandra Wilder for one year. In 1987, she starred alongside Michael Douglas and Glenn Close in the psychological thriller film Fatal Attraction. The film became a huge box office success, and Archer was nominated for a BAFTA, Golden Globe and Academy Award for Best Supporting Actress and for her role as Beth Gallagher.

In 1990, she had leading roles in three movies: Love at Large alongside Tom Berenger, Narrow Margin, and Eminent Domain. She starred alongside Harrison Ford in the 1992 spy thriller film Patriot Games and its sequel Clear and Present Danger (1994). In 1993, she starred opposite Madonna and Willem Dafoe in the erotic thriller Body of Evidence; the film was widely panned and at the 14th Golden Raspberry Awards Archer received nomination for Worst Supporting Actress. Later that year, she starred in the Robert Altman ensemble comedy-drama film Short Cuts, receiving special Golden Globe Award and Venice Film Festival Special Volpi Cup. 

In 2000, Archer co-starred in the war film Rules of Engagement and the action film The Art of War. Her other notable film credits include Man of the House (2005) opposite Tommy Lee Jones, Ghosts of Girlfriends Past (2009; also featured her former Fatal Attraction co-star Michael Douglas, although they shared no scenes together), and Lullaby (2014). In 2001, Archer portrayed Mrs. Robinson at the Gielgud Theatre in a West End production of The Graduate. 

In 2014 and 2016, she played Jane Fonda in the premier production of the play The Trial of Jane Fonda, at the Edinburgh Festival Fringe. Also in 2000s, she had recurring roles on several television shows such as Boston Public, It's Always Sunny in Philadelphia, and Ghost Whisperer. From 2008 to 2009, she starred in the short-lived CW comedy-drama Privileged.

Filmography

Film

Television films

Television series

Awards and nominations

References

External links

 
 
 
 Anne Archer Biography, filmreference.com; accessed January 15, 2018.

Living people
1947 births
20th-century American actresses
21st-century American actresses
Actresses from Los Angeles
American film actresses
American former Christians
American Scientologists
American television actresses
Former Christian Scientists
Pitzer College alumni
Volpi Cup winners